Sigara virginiensis is a species of water boatman in the family Corixidae. It is found in North America.

References

Articles created by Qbugbot
Insects described in 1948
Sigara
Hemiptera of North America